Barbara Neubert Rusling (née Neubert; born November 11, 1945) is a real estate broker and former Texas legislator who represented the 57th district of the Texas House of Representatives from 1995 to 1997. She is a Republican.

Background
Barbara Neubert was born on November 11, 1945 in St. Louis, Missouri. She attended Baylor University and Vanderbilt University where she earned a BA. Rusling is president and principal broker of Caldwell Banker Hallmark Realty, a position she has held since 1983. Formerly, from 1976 to 1983, she was in real estate sales and was a trainer. She was married to Robert B. Rusling, whom died in 2004. Her residence is in Waco, Texas.

Political career
A Republican, Rusling served in the Texas House of Representatives during the 74th legislature from January 10, 1995 to January 14, 1997. She was preceded by Betty Denton and was succeeded by Jim Dunnam.

References

1945 births
Living people
People from St. Louis
American real estate brokers
Republican Party members of the Texas House of Representatives
Baylor University alumni
Vanderbilt University alumni